Hendra Wijaya (born 4 August 1989) is an Indonesian professional footballer who plays as a defender for Liga 2 club Bekasi City.

Honours

Club
PSM Makassar
 Piala Indonesia: 2019
RANS Cilegon
 Liga 2 runner-up: 2021

References

External links
 Hendra Wijaya at Liga Indonesia
 

1989 births
Living people
Indonesian Muslims
Indonesian footballers
PSM Makassar players
PSIM Yogyakarta players
RANS Nusantara F.C. players
Liga 1 (Indonesia) players
Liga 2 (Indonesia) players
People from Gowa Regency
Sportspeople from South Sulawesi
Association football defenders